Fayzulla Ubaydullayevich Xoʻjayev (Файзулла Убайдуллоевич Хўжаев; ; 1896, Bukhara – March 1938, Moscow) was a Bukharan politician that served as the first head of the Bukharan People's Soviet Republic, which would later form part of the Uzbek Soviet Socialist Republic.

Early years
Xoʻjayev was born into an Uzbek family of wealthy traders in the City of Bukhara, Emirate of Bukhara in 1896. He was sent to Moscow by his father in 1907. There he realized the tremendous gap between contemporary European society and technology, and the ancient, tradition-bound ways of his homeland. His father died in 1912.

He joined the Pan-Turkist Jadid movement of like-minded reformers in 1916, and, with his father's fortune, established the Young Bukharan Party. In March 1918, after the Bolsheviks had successfully established Soviet rule in Kokand, Xoʻjayev led an attempt to form a Young Bukharan government, with the Emir of Bukhara as a figurehead. For a few days, it appeared that they had succeeded, and had the Emir as a virtual prisoner, but in his account, written later, Xoʻjayev admitted that he and his fellow revolutionaries had been "gullible" and had underestimated the influence of the clergy and the strength of forces loyal to the old regime. In the resulting reaction, thousands of supporters of the Young Bukharans were killed. Xoʻjayev escaped to Tashkent and was sentenced to death in his absence. He was able to return only after the Emir of Bukhara fled in September 1920 after the Red Army had overthrown his administration on 2 September 1920, bombed the city of Bukhara and occupied it.

The government years

After joining the Russian Communist Party about July–August 1920, at the age of 24, Fayzulla Xoʻjayev was appointed Chairman of the Council of People's Nazirs (i.e. head of government) of the Bukharan People's Soviet Republic in September 1920. During his term, he barely escaped assassination by Basmachi Revolt leader Enver Pasha. The Bukharan Republic was temporarily recognised as an independent state by the Soviet government in Moscow, who sent an ambassador and 'advisers' to support Xoʻjayev's government. One of the Russian diplomats, Alexander Barmine, recalled:

With the reorganization of Soviet Central Asia into the new Uzbek Soviet Socialist Republic and after the purge of suspected Uzbek nationalists in 1923–1924, on 5 December 1924, Xoʻjayevbecame Chair of the Revolutionary Committee of the Uzbek SSR – at which time he was recognized as the head of government – and then on 17 February 1925, he became Chair of the Council of People's Commissars of the Uzbek Soviet Socialist Republic. Then on 21 May 1925, he became one of the chairmen of the USSR Central Executive Committee once the Uzbek SSR was officially accepted into the USSR.

However, Xoʻjayev opposed Joseph Stalin's heavy-handed control, particularly in the matter of cotton monoculture. Although he retained his post as head of government, from 1929 his influence and access to Moscow was eclipsed by Akmal Ikramov, the First Secretary of the Uzbek communist party. Unlike Ikramov, Xoʻjayev was never elected to the Central Committee of the Communist Party of the Soviet Union

The final years
In June 1937, Xoʻjayev, though still nominally head of the Uzbek government, was conspicuously absent when the Uzbek Communist Party held its Seventh Congress. He was not even elected a delegate. On 27 June, ten days after the congress ended, he was removed from office. He was arrested by 9 July 1937. In September, a member of the Politburo, Andrey Andreyev arrived in Tashkent to bring the Great Purge to Uzbekistan, and on 8 September and seven others were denounced as "enemies of the people".

Andrew D. W. Forbes writes that Xoʻjayev was also "accused of having buried his dead brother according to Islamic rites".

In March 1938, Xoʻjayev and Ikramov were both arraigned at the Trial of the Twenty-One in Moscow. Though accused of acting together, their hostility was apparent in the courtroom, with each accusing the other of lying. Khodhayev "confessed" that in the early 1920s he had been a member of a secret pan-Turkic society, Milli Ittikhad (National Unification) that wanted to preserve the Bukharan Republic as an independent buffer state, between Russia and the British Empire, that he had opposed the breakdown of Turkestan into four separate soviet republics, of which Uzbekistan was one, and opposed the decision  made in Moscow as part of the First five-year plan  to create a cotton monoculture in Uzbekistan's Ferghana Valley, and to being linked to the Right Opposition. He was sentenced to death, and executed on 13 March 1938.

Legacy
Officially rehabilitated in 1966, he remains a controversial figure in modern Uzbekistan.

There are few monuments to him in modern Uzbekistan, and although his father's house in Bukhara is preserved as a monument, it is styled as "House of a Wealthy Local Merchant", with very little emphasis on Xoʻjayev himself.

References

World Statesmen – Uzbekistan
Archontology – Fayzulla Xoʻjayev

1896 births
1938 deaths
Jadids
People from Bukhara
20th-century Uzbekistani people
Case of the Anti-Soviet "Bloc of Rightists and Trotskyites"
Communist Party of Uzbekistan politicians
Communism in Uzbekistan
Great Purge victims from Uzbekistan
Soviet rehabilitations
Soviet show trials
Pan-Turkists
Bukharan People's Soviet Republic
Uzbek revolutionaries
Recipients of the Order of Lenin
Recipients of the Order of the Red Banner
Heads of government of the Uzbek Soviet Socialist Republic
Muslim socialists